The Scuole Grandi (literally 'Great Schools', plural of ) were confraternity or sodality institutions in Venice, Italy. They were founded as early as the 13th century as charitable and religious organizations for the laity. These institutions had a key role in the history and development of music. The first groups of bowed instrument players named  were born there in the early 16th century.

Membership and responsibilities
Unlike the trade guilds or the numerous , the Scuole Grandi included persons of many occupations, although citizenship was required. Unlike the rigidly aristocratic Venetian governmental Great Council of Venice, which for centuries only admitted a restricted number of noble families, membership in the Scuole Grandi was open to all citizens, and did not permit nobles to gain director roles. Citizens could include persons in the third generation of residency in the island republic, or persons who had paid taxes in Venice for fifteen years.

The Scuole Grandi proved to be one of the few outlets for non-noble Venetian citizens to control powerful institutions. Their activities grew to encompass the organization of processions, sponsoring festivities, distribution of money, food and clothing to poorer members, provision of dowries to daughters, burial of paupers, and the supervision of hospitals.

Their autonomy was lost during the Renaissance when the institutions were subjected to a specific magistracy that ruled the office of the leaders and oversaw the drafting of capitulars. After a process of secularization, charities lost their Christian identity and were absorbed into the Venetian structure of the state that encompassed an exhibiting unity-order among the social classes of the republic, as depicted in the Procession in St. Mark's Square (Gentile Bellini, 1496).

While Venice deleted the Middle Age ius commune from its hierarchy of the sources of law, Grandi Scuole were divided into two opposite classes, and started to  under the central direction of private banks, even if within the bounds of their history redistribution rules. The Poverty Laws approved in 1528–1529 entrusted from the state to the Grandi Scuole system all charitable and social activities, like handouts, drugs, burials of needy persons, hospices for widows and children, food and lodging for pilgrims, brotherhood for prisoners. The Serenissima kept for itself a residual role in social justice, uniquely related to those forms of poverty that may become a negative element for the new order of the aristocratic republic.

Structure and physical layout
The Scuole Grandi were regulated by the Procurators of Venice, who set forth a complex balance of elected offices, mirroring the structures of the republic.

They often had an affiliated hospital and church. The Scuola often sheltered relics, commissioned famous works of art, or patronized musicians and composers.

List of Scuole Grandi
By 1552, there were six Scuole Grandi: 
Scuola Grande della Carità (founded 1260) now part of the Gallerie dell'Accademia
Scuola Grande di San Giovanni Evangelista (founded 1261)
Scuola vecchia della Misericordia (founded 1308)
Scuola Grande di San Marco (founded 1260)
Scuola Grande di San Rocco (founded late 15th century)
Scuola Grande di San Teodoro (founded 1530 or 1552)

The Scuola Grande dei Carmini was the last of its kind to be recognized as a Scuola Grande in 1767 by the Council of Ten.

References

Bibliography

 "Viol and Lute Makers of Venice 1490 -1630" Ed. Venice research 2012, 

 
Buildings and structures in Venice
Culture of the Republic of Venice
13th-century establishments in the Republic of Venice
Confraternities